Bratsberg-Demokraten ("The Bratsberg Democrat") was a Norwegian newspaper, published in Skien in Telemark county. From 1924 to 1929 it was named Telemark Kommunistblad.

Bratsberg-Demokraten was started on 7 April 1908, as the Labour Party needed an organ in the county Telemark (then named Bratsberg). On 10 January 1921 it was merged with Nybrott to form Folkets Dagblad, a regional newspaper for both Telemark and Vestfold, but the merger was reversed after 19 May 1922. Bratsberg-Demokraten continued.

In 1923 it was usurped by the Communist Party of Norway. It changed name from 2 January 1924 to Telemark Kommunistblad. It lasted until 28 June 1929, and was survived by Labour's Telemark Arbeiderblad.

Eivind Reiersen was a noted editor, holding the post from 1919 to 1921 (a bit into the Folkets Dagblad period) and from 1924 to 1928.

References

1908 establishments in Norway
1929 disestablishments in Norway
Communist Party of Norway newspapers
Defunct newspapers published in Norway
Labour Party (Norway) newspapers
Mass media in Skien
Norwegian-language newspapers
Newspapers established in 1908
Publications disestablished in 1921
Newspapers established in 1922
Publications disestablished in 1929